Herbert William Chard (17 October 1869 – 9 January 1932) was an English cricketer. Chard was a right-handed batsman who bowled right-arm medium pace. He was born at Westbury, Bristol.

Chard made two first-class appearances for Gloucestershire in 1889 against Surrey at The Oval and Sussex at the County Ground, Hove. He scored 35 runs at an average of 8.75, with a high score of 32, while with the ball he took 3 wickets at a bowling average of 45.33, with best figures of 2/27.

He died at Cotham, Bristol, on 9 January 1932.

References

External links
Herbert Chard at ESPNcricinfo
Herbert Chard at CricketArchive

1869 births
1932 deaths
Cricketers from Bristol
English cricketers
Gloucestershire cricketers
English cricketers of 1864 to 1889